The Raghojirao Ramjirao Bhangre also spell Bhangaria (8 November 1805 – 2 May 1848) was an Indian revolutionary who challenged and defied the British power in Maharashtra. He was the son of Ramji Bhangre, a Koli who also resisted the British rule and was subsequently hanged in Cellular Jail. He was only ten years old when he took up arms against British rule in Maharashtra.

The main reason of revolt by Raghoji Bhangare was torture of his mother by British officials with the assistance of some Marwadis of village.

Indian social activist, thinker, anti-caste social reformer and writer from Maharashtra Jyotirao Phule was inspired by the revolts of Raghoji Bhangre. The revolts of Raghoji Bhangare are considered as most significant in history of Maharashtra. Compared to the revolts made by Raghoji Bhangre,  the other revolts were not very significant though they continued to take place until 1946-47.

Raghoji Bhangre was titled as Bandkari for his revolts. Bandkari means leader of rebellions in Marathi language.

Early life 
Raghoji Rao was born in 1805 to Ramjirao Bhangre in Deogaon of Akole in Western Ghat of Maharashtra in British India. His family members were Mahadev Koli and were active in Indian independence movement. His father Ramji Bhangre also served as Jamadar in the British Police but latter gave up the job and revolted against British government. After death of his father, he succeeded his father as Patil of Devgam and head of family.

Revolutionary activities 
In 1818, the Maratha Empire  was defeated by British in the Battle of Koregaon. After that the tribals of Maharashtra took to slavery and Raghoji Rao raised against British rule in the minor age. He captured the British treasure and he was declared as an Outlaw. After that he resisted the government in Poona. In 1844, Raghoji along with his brother Bapuji Bhangre led the anti-british uprisings in Ahmednagar, Nashik and Pune district. Raghoji with his brother Bapuji Bhangre cut off the noses of british officers, Sahukars and Zamidars. After that the Captain Giberne seized a party of rebels. At 20 September 1844, Raghuji killed an officer and ten constables in the hills. In 1845, his rebellion spread over Pune, Satara and Purandar. A reward of five thousands rupees was announced for the capture of Raghoji.

Death 
On 2 May 1848, Bangre was caught by Lieutenant-General Gell and hanged.

Tribute 

In 2014, The Chief minister of Maharashtra, Prithviraj Chavan inaugurated a Circuit House in Thane named after Raghoji.

See also 
 List of Koli people
 List of Koli states and clans

References

Further reading 

Koli people
Indian rebels
1805 births
1848 deaths